Brodek u Přerova (until 1949 Brodek) is a market town in Přerov District in the Olomouc Region of the Czech Republic. It has about 1,900 inhabitants.

Administrative parts

The village of Luková is an administrative part of Brodek u Přerova.

Geography
Most of the municipal territory lies in the Upper Morava Valley, the village of Luková lies already in the southern tip of the Nízký Jeseník mountain range. The Olešnice Stream flows north of the market town.

History
The first written mention of Brodek is from 1301. Brodek was a property of the Dominican Monastery in Olomouc until 1782.

Brodek u Přerova was promoted to a market town in 1909. This title was restored in 2009.

Economy
The market town is known for bellfounding. Many church bells of the churches in the Czech Republic have been cast in local workshop of Dytrych family, founded in 1951.

Sights
The Church of the Nativity of Saint John the Baptist was built in the pseudo-Romanesque style in 1893.

in 2000, the Brodek carillon was put into operation, manufactured in a local workshop.

Notable people
Vlastimil Brlica (1928–2019), athlete

References

External links

 

Market towns in the Czech Republic
Populated places in Přerov District